Nine-O-One Network was an American bi-monthly music magazine published in Memphis, Tennessee from 1986 to 1989.

Beginnings
The magazine originated during the heralded 1986 "Class of '55" recording session in Memphis with Johnny Cash, Jerry Lee Lewis, Roy Orbison and Carl Perkins. Producer Chips Moman asked James L. Dickerson, a reporter with The Commercial Appeal newspaper in Memphis, if he would create a magazine that could be used as part of a sales package for a telemarketing campaign for the album. Dickerson agreed to do it without fee if Moman would allow him to name the magazine, copyright it, and use it to launch a bi-monthly music magazine. Moman agreed, and the magazine was named Nine-O-One Network, the name derived from Memphis's telephone area code, 901. Dickerson resigned from The Commercial Appeal to publish the magazine so that he would not have a conflict of interest.

The first subscription check to arrive in the mail came from Cash. Soon afterward a subscription check arrived from Lewis.

By the end of the first year, the full-color, slick paper magazine had newsstand circulation in fourteen states. By the end of 1987 it was sold on newsstands in all 50 states and throughout Canada, and in selected cities in Portugal, Japan, Australia and the Soviet Union. The distributor was Capital Distribution Co. of Derby, Connecticut. At its peak, the magazine had a circulation of 100,000 which made it the third-largest music magazine in the United States, behind Rolling Stone and Spin.

Initially, the magazine was financed by Dickerson, who used his savings and cashed in his life insurance policy to live on and pay start-up costs. The magazine was incorporated in the State of Tennessee and preferred common stock was offered, all of it purchased by 25 Mississippi and Tennessee investors.

The first issue featured a photograph of Cash, Perkins, Orbison and Lewis. The second issue featured Rolling Stone Ron Wood as the cover story, with inside articles about Belinda Carlisle, the Fabulous Thunderbirds, Steve Wariner and Sweethearts of the Rodeo. The eclectic mix reflected the magazine's philosophy that a true American music magazine should contain articles about all the major forms of native music rock and roll, country, blues and jazz.

Covers

 Issue 1 Johnny Cash, Jerry Lee Lewis, Roy Orbison and Carl Perkins
 Issue 2 Ron Wood of The Rolling Stones
 Issue 3 Deborah Allen
 Issue 4 Aimee Mann
 Issue 5 Robert Cray
 Issue 6 Gregg Allman
 Issue 7 Elvis Presley
 Issue 8 David Bowie and Ringo Starr
 Issue 9 The Bangles and B.B. King
 Issue 10 Ann and Nancy Wilson of Heart; Waylon Jennings
 Issue 11 Dan Fogelberg, Willie Nelson and Yes

Information for music scholars
Back issues of Nine-O-One Network Magazine are available at:

 Memphis, Tennessee, Public Library, Benjamin Hooks Central Library Benjamin L. Hooks Central Library

Magazine spin-off
In 1988, the magazine formed a spin-off company to produce a radio syndication called Pulsebeat Voice of the Heartland.  With James L. Dickerson as executive producer, the company produced two programs a 30-minute, weekly country music program that was carried by about 60 radio stations from coast to coast, and a 60-minute blues program that was produced in partnership with Helena, Arkansas, radio station KFFA-Am, which had broadcast since 1941 the universally acclaimed ''King Biscuit Time' show.

Both syndicated programs featured radio personality Kim Spangler.  Veteran King Biscuit announcer "Sunshine" Sonny Payne, KFFA general manager George Hays and Memphis radio personality Henry Nelson also hosted segments on the blues show. The weekly blues show was broadcast by 40 stations from New York City to the Yukon. Featured guests included Stevie Ray Vaughan, B.B. King, Bobby "Blue" Bland, Melissa Etheridge and Little Milton.  Pulsebeat—Voice of the Heartland ceased operations in 1990.

See also

 List of defunct American magazines
 List of music magazines

References 

1986 establishments in Tennessee
1989 disestablishments in Tennessee
Bimonthly magazines published in the United States
Music magazines published in the United States
Defunct magazines published in the United States
English-language magazines
Magazines disestablished in 1989
Magazines established in 1986
Mass media in Memphis, Tennessee
Magazines published in Tennessee